Danny Schmidt (born October 7, 1970) is an American singer-songwriter based in Austin, Texas, where he now lives with his wife, fellow musician and singer-songwriter Carrie Elkin.

Biography
Schmidt was born in 1970 and grew up in Austin, Texas. He started playing guitar at the age of 12. At age 20, he discovered that he liked the blues after tracking the music of Jimi Hendrix back through Muddy Waters, Mississippi John Hurt, and Lightning Hopkins all the way to old country gospel and spirituals. He bought an acoustic guitar and eventually discovered Bob Dylan, Neil Young, Tom Waits, and John Prine, from whom he learned songwriting.

After three years of college, he joined the East Wind Community in the Ozark Mountains of southern Missouri for a year. He then became part of the Twin Oaks Community in the Blue Ridge Mountains of Virginia for about four years, where he met fellow singer-songwriter Devon Sproule. At 25, Schmidt began writing songs  a developing talent which ultimately earned him the 2007 Kerrville Folk Festival New Folk award.

In 1999, he settled for a while in Charlottesville, Virginia where his songwriting flourished and he started sharing his songs with the public. That year he released his first recording, an album titled Live at the Prism Coffeehouse. In 2001 he released Enjoying the Fall. 2003 brought his third collection of songs, Make Right the Time. In 2005, Schmidt released Parables & Primes. 2007 saw the release of Little Grey Sheep and 2009 the release of Instead the Forest Rose to Singhis first release on Red House Records. In 2011, Schmidt released Man of Many Moons, also on Red House.

Schmidt was a part of the original King of My Living Room group of Charlottesville songwriters—which included such artists as Brady Earnhart, Danny Schmidt, Stratton Salidis, Jan Smith, Lance Brenner, Browning Porter, and Jeff Romanowho would go on to do a series of concerts together, the first CD of which was recorded in 2001. He's appeared in each of the four performances since, including the latest November 2007 at the Gravity Lounge in Charlottesville.

The debut King of My Living Room performance in Charlottesville convinced fellow singer-songwriter Paul Curreri to make his home there. Schmidt, Curreri, and Sproule became housemates, with Paul and Devon marrying soon after. Curreri later wrote and recorded a letter in song form to Danny, who responded with the yet-to-be-produced song Two Guitars, which he began performing live in 2009. Danny recorded his fifth album Little Grey Sheep (2008) in the Curreri/Sproule home, with Curreri serving as a production engineer.

In 2005 Schmidt toured up and down the east and west coasts, as well as in Alaska, the United Kingdom, Italy, The Netherlands, France, and Italy.

In 2012, his song "This Too Shall Pass" was featured in the weather section of episode 8 of the popular podcast Welcome to Night Vale. His song "Echo in the Hills", performed alongside Carrie Elkin, was also featured in the podcast on August 1, 2014. In early 2015, Schmidt toured with the crew of the podcast, performing live versions of his songs with Elkin, as a part of their live episodes.

Religion
Born into a Jewish family, Schmidt does not feel his religion is either distinct or critical to understanding his art. As he puts it, when discussing his song "Sad Songs Walking":

Recordings 
Schmidt's album Little Grey Sheep (2008) was #1 Album on the Folk DJ Charts (FOLKDJ-L forum radio playlists) for February 2008 with four songs from the release: "Company Of Friends", "Leaves Are Burning", "Drawing Board", and "Tales Of Sweet Odysseus". A collection of songs from his 2009 release Instead the Forest Rose To Sing made it No. 1 Album on the Folk DJ Charts again for March and April 2009; ranking No. 2 in May 2009. Plays of songs from his 2011 release Man Of Many Moons — i.e., "Man Of Many Moons", "Houses Sing", "Buckets Of Rain", "Ragtime Ragtime Blues" — ranked it No. 3 Album played for February 2011, the month it was released. This made three Schmidt albums in a row to rate highly on these lists.

Of Schmidt's 2015 release Owls, Frank Gutch of No Depression said, "Danny Schmidt is a lyric machine. He tells stories. He creates magic — good and bad. He goes places I did not know existed."

Musical style
Danny Schmidt's writing spans from deeply rooted Appalachian mountain gospel to English balladry, from syncopated Piedmont country blues to vagabond protest folk-stumpery. His main influences are Townes Van Zandt, Bob Dylan, Leonard Cohen, Neil Young, and Dave Carter. In the Spring 2008 issue of Sing Out! magazine, journalist Matt Watroba noted that Schmidt's arrangements are powerful, his performances are laid-back yet energetic, while his lyrics are sheer poetry.

Awards, honors, distinctions 
In July 2010, Chicago Tribune music reviewer Rich Warren declared him one of the 50 most significant singer-songwriters of folk in the last 50 years, together with other such notable singer-songwriters as Harry Chapin, Leonard Cohen, Judy Collins, Bob Dylan, and John McCutcheon.
He was one of six winners of the 2007 Grassy Hill Kerrville New Folk award selected from 32 finalists who performed during the 2007 Grassy Hill Kerrville New Folk Concerts on May 26 & 27.
He was part of the original King of My Living Room group of Charlottesville songwriters—which has come to include such notable artists as Paul Curreri and Devon Sproule—the first CD of which recorded in 2001. He's appeared in their performances since, including the latest November 2007 at the Gravity Lounge in Charlottesville.

Personal

Schmidt is married to singer-songwriter Carrie Elkin who gave birth to their first child in 2016. They live together in Austin.

Discography

See also
Red House Records
Twin Oaks Community
East Wind Community

References

External links

Danny Schmidt official homepage
Danny Schmidt at Facebook
Danny Schmidt at MySpace
Carrie Elkin and Danny Schmidt at Red House Records
Carrie Elkin at Red House Records.
Danny Schmidt at Bandcamp
Danny Schmidt at AllMusic
Danny Schmidt at Sonicbids
Danny Schmidt Radio Pandora
Live Recordings of Danny Schmidt at archive.org's Live Music Archive
2007 Grassy Hill Kerrville New Folk Winners
King of My Living Room show, CDs, and history

FOLKDJ-L "the global discussion forum for Folk DJs".

1970 births
Living people
Jewish American musicians
Singer-songwriters from Texas
American folk musicians
American folk guitarists
American male guitarists
American male singer-songwriters
Musicians from Austin, Texas
Writers from Austin, Texas
Jewish folk singers
Guitarists from Texas
21st-century American singers
21st-century American guitarists
21st-century American male singers
Waterbug Records artists
Red House Records artists
21st-century American Jews